S-80 was a diesel-electric submarine of the Soviet Navy.

Its keel was laid down on 13 March 1950 at Krasnoye Sormovo as a Project 613 unit (NATO).  It was launched on 21 October, and delivered to Baku on the Caspian Sea on 1 November for tests, then transferred north via inland waterways in December.  It was commissioned into the Northern Fleet on 2 December 1952, and operated there until mid-1957.

Beginning in July 1957, S-80 was overhauled at Severodvinsk and converted to Project 644 ("Whiskey Twin-Cylinder") guided missile submarine, by having launch tubes for two SS-N-3 Shaddock anti-ship missiles fitted externally. It returned to sea in April 1959.

Sinking
During the night of 26 January 1961, S-80 was operating in the Barents Sea at snorkel depth on its diesel engines. At 01:27 on 27 January, the boat dropped below snorkel depth, which should have caused the automatic snorkel valve to shut, preventing water from entering the snorkel system. However, the de-icing system that should have warmed the valve with hot water from the diesel engines had been switched off, and the valve had become jammed with ice.

The diesel engines failed immediately as seawater flooded their air intakes. The machinist in the fifth compartment who discovered the flooding became confused by the complex array of valves, and did not shut the ventilation flapper valve quickly enough.  By the time he located the correct handwheel, the valve spindle had been bent by the force of the flooding water. As the compartment filled, the boat's trim became uncontrollable.

As its up-angle passed 45 degrees, the boat slowed, coming to a halt and then falling backward, gathering sternway and sinking until it grounded. The second, third, and fourth compartments were crushed, though 24 crewmen survived in the after compartments.  Their attempts to escape the wrecked submarine using IDA-51 apparatuses failed, and all 68 officers and men of S-80 were lost.  Their fate remained unknown for seven and a half years.

Recovery

The crew inspected the wreck with its bathyscape and identified it as S-80.

A government commission studied the report and ordered Operation "Depth," the salvage of the wreck. The Nikolayevsk Shipyard built Karpaty, a special salvage vessel equipped to raise the sunken submarine.

Operation "Depth" was carried out by a task force of the Northern Fleet consisting of groups of trawlers and a destroyer under the command of Captain First Rank S. Minchenko. The wreck was lifted from the ocean floor on 9 June 1969 and transported to Mys Teriberskiy, suspended under Karpaty in slings.

On 24 July 1969, S-80 was raised to the surface. During August, a government commission began studying the wreck under the management of Hero of the Soviet Union Vice Admiral Grigory Shchedrin. The commission determined not only the immediate causes of the boat's loss, but also that two further errors had compounded the accident: the crew never attempted to shift propulsion to the electric motors, and they never performed an emergency ballast tank blow.

References

Bibliography

External links
 Книга памяти - C-80 

Whiskey-class submarines
Ships built in the Soviet Union
1950 ships
Cold War submarines of the Soviet Union
Maritime incidents in 1961
Lost submarines of the Soviet Union
Shipwrecks in the Barents Sea
1961 in the Soviet Union
Maritime incidents in the Soviet Union
Ships lost with all hands
Ships built by Krasnoye Sormovo Factory No. 112